Made in L.A. is a 2007 documentary film that tells the story of three Latina immigrants as they wage a battle against their employer, a Los Angeles garment factory. After years of domestic abuse and meager salaries, Lupe Hernandez, Maura Colorado, and María Pineda join together in their struggle for self-empowerment and negotiated working conditions.

Made in L.A. was written, directed, and produced by Almudena Carracedo and was aired as part of PBS's Point of View documentary series.

References

External links
 P.O.V. Made in L.A. - PBS's site dedicated to the film
 Made in L.A. - Official Website
 

2007 films
2007 documentary films
POV (TV series) films
Documentary films about immigration to the United States
Documentary films about labor relations in the United States
American documentary films
Documentary films about Los Angeles
2000s American films